David Bulow (February 4, 1980 – May 6, 2021) was an American soccer player and coach. A midfielder, his playing career spanned 14 years and included three stints with the Kickers, as well as stints in Ireland and elsewhere in the United States. He coached the Richmond Kickers in 2018–2019.

Career

College and amateur
Bulow attended Bowdoin College where he played on the school’s NCAA Division III men’s soccer team from 1998 to 2001. He holds the record for most goals in a season with seventeen and is second on the career goals list with thirty-two. He was a 2001 third team All-American.

From 2001 to 2004, he played for the Cape Cod Crusaders in the USL Premier Development League. He led them to the league championship in 2002 and 2003, and in 2004 he scored 21 goals in 18 games.

Professional
In the fall of 2004, Bulow had a brief stint with Limavady United in the Irish Football League. In September 2005, he signed with Limavady United in Northern Ireland, before transferring to Dungannon Swifts for the remainder of the 2005-2006 season. That season, the Swifts won the Mid-Ulster Cup.

At the end of the season, he returned to Cape Cod Crusaders for the 2006 PDL season where he served as an assistant coach as well as a player. At the end of the season, he transferred to Richmond Kickers of the USL Second Division in time to win the USL-2 championship. He then returned to Dungannon Swifts for the 2006-2007 Northern Ireland season. In June 2007, he signed with the Richmond Kickers of the USL Second Division. He spent the next three seasons with the team, scoring 25 goals in 51 appearances, and helping the team to the 2009 USL2 Championship.
Bulow was released by Richmond at the end of 2009, and signed for the Real Maryland Monarchs in 2010. After one season in Maryland, Bulow signed a multi-year contract on 4 January 2011 to play for Richmond Kickers and coach for the Richmond Kickers Youth Soccer Club.

Bulow coached the Kickers from 2018 to 2019. In that span the Kickers won 15 out of 62 games played. Bulow was eventually relieved of his duties.

Death
Bulow suffered a stroke after a fall on April 24, 2021.  He fell into a coma, and died without awakening on May 6, 2021.

Honors
Cape Cod Crusaders
Premier Development League Champions: 2003

Richmond Kickers
USL Second Division Champions: 2009

References

1980 births
2021 deaths
Sportspeople from Denver
American expatriate soccer players
Colorado Rapids U-23 players
Cape Cod Crusaders players
Dungannon Swifts F.C. players
NIFL Premiership players
Limavady United F.C. players
Real Maryland F.C. players
Richmond Kickers players
Richmond Kickers coaches
USL Second Division players
USL League Two players
USL First Division coaches
Soccer players from Denver
USL Championship players
American soccer players
Association football midfielders
USL League One coaches
American soccer coaches
Bowdoin Polar Bears men's soccer players
Deaths from falls